By 1659 Piro Indians had begun settling in the area of Paso del Norte.  The Mission Nuestra Señora de Guadalupe was established by Fray García for them. This mission became the southernmost of the New Mexico chain of missions along El Camino Real from Mexico City to Santa Fe. The original structure remains as a side chapel of the Cathedral of Juarez. The Piro settlement formed the core of the original Ciudad del El Paso del Norte, which later became La Ciudad de Benito Juárez and is in the present-day state of Chihuahua.
The festival which began there, Tortugas Pueblo Fiesta of Our Lady of Guadalupe, moved later to Tortugas.

See also
 Spanish missions in New Mexico

Spanish missions in New Mexico